Mechado is a braised beef dish originating from the Philippines inspired by culinary methods of Spain, of which it was a former colony. Soy sauce and calamansi fruits are key ingredients to the braising liquid.

Etymology

The name mechado is derived from the Spanish term mecha, meaning "wick", due to the way the larded beef resembles a candle. The term was adopted in the Filipino language as mitsa, though the spelling mitsado for the dish is unorthodox and rarely seen.

Preparation

The traditional version of the dish uses a Spanish culinary practice of threading strips of pork back-fat (the "wicks") through thick cuts of inexpensive beef (specifically the chuck) to provide both succulence and flavor. The larded beef are then marinated in soy sauce, calamansi, and black pepper. They are then quickly browned on all sides in hot oil, and then braised in the marinade with the addition of beef broth, onions, and bay leaves until tender; the liquid reducing to a thick gravy.  Fish sauce is often added during the braise as seasoning. The dish can be cooked in tomato sauce in a clay pot.

Over the years, the name of the dish has increasingly come to encompass variations that use thinner slices or even bony cuts of beef and that have dispensed with the larding process altogether.  Newer variations of the dish resemble more like a beef stew. A popular incarnation of mechado features tomatoes predominantly in the braising liquid, as well as cuts of potatoes.

Beef tongue can be similarly treated with little or no variation to produce another dish called lengua mechada.

See also
 Balbacua
 Kare-kare
 Kaldereta
 Philippine adobo
 List of beef dishes
 List of stews

References

Philippine stews
Beef dishes
Philippine beef dishes